Bham may refer to:

People
Min Bahadur Bham, Nepali film director
Navnit Bham (1928–2007), Indian film director
 Y Bham Enoul, leader of United Front for the Liberation of Oppressed Races

Other uses
 Bham Dam in Maharashtra, India

See also
 Bham Bolenath, film
 Bahm
 Bam (disambiguation)
 Birmingham (disambiguation)
 Bellingham (disambiguation)